Mischa Rossen (born 23 March 1972) is a Dutch sailor who has competed in four Paralympics games winning silver in 2004 and gold in 2012 both in the three person keelboat the sonar.

References

External links
 
 

1972 births
Living people
Dutch male sailors (sport)
Dutch disabled sportspeople
World champions in sailing for the Netherlands
Sonar class world champions
Disabled sailing world champions
Paralympic sailors of the Netherlands
Paralympic medalists in sailing
Paralympic gold medalists for the Netherlands
Sailors at the 2000 Summer Paralympics
Sailors at the 2004 Summer Paralympics
Sailors at the 2012 Summer Paralympics
21st-century Dutch people